CID-201 was a digital computer produced in Cuba in 1970.

History
Cuba had already produced the analog computer SILNA 999. In 1969, the Cuban leader Fidel Castro asked during a visit to the University of Havana if Cuba could produce a digital computer.
The  (CID, "Center for Digital Researches") was formed.
The project was directed by Luis Carrasco and mostly designed by Orlando Ramos.
The first version was designed using transistors.
After the introduction of integrated circuits, the design was changed.
It was inspired by the American 1959 PDP-1.
The components were mostly Japanese, due to the American embargo on Cuba.

On 18 April 1970, the first computer was produced. 
It was named CID-201 following the earlier digital watch CID-101.
It could do 25 000 additions/second.
Its memory held 4 096 12-bit words.
It was considered a third-generation computer.

It could be programmed in LEAL ("algorithmic language").

A later version is the CID-201 A.
The CID also produced the CID-201 B, CID-300, CID-1408 and CID-1417. 
Among the peripherals produced, several thousands of displays were exported to the Soviet Union.

Application
The first computer was installed in the sugar refinery Camilo Cienfuegos to control the railroad traffic during the sugarcane harvest.
Another one was installed in the Ecuador refinery.

Several thousand computers were produced. 
It was also used in the education of Cuban technicians.

Legacy
 On 2010, the Cuban Administración Postal issued a stamp commemorating the CID-201.

See also
 History of computer hardware in Eastern Bloc countries

References

1970 establishments in Cuba
Cuban inventions
12-bit computers
Minicomputers
Science and technology in Cuba
Computer-related introductions in 1970